Armageddon is a 1997 Hong Kong action sci-fi romance film  directed by Gordon Chan, and starring Andy Lau, Michelle Reis and Anthony Wong.

Summary
In the near future, 10 men are voted as the 10 who could lead the world; on the list is leading Hong Kong scientist Dr. Ken (Andy Lau). When some of the other important figures on the list start dying in suspicious cases of spontaneous human combustion, the Hong Kong CID and the British MI6 get involved to try to protect Dr. Ken. Ken's close friend in the Hong Kong police, Chiu (Anthony Wong) helps Ken stay out of trouble.

Cast
 Andy Lau as Dr. Tak Ken
 Michelle Reis as Adele
 Anthony Wong as Chiu Tai-pang
 Vincent Kok as TC
 Wayne Lai as Chuck
 Claudia Lau as Superintendent Ivy Yip
 Jessica Chau as Teresa
 Michael Lui as Clarence Chung
 Angel Wong as Janis
 Kam Kong as Mr. Yao
 Jacky Wong
 Steven Lau

See also
Andy Lau filmography

References

External links

 

1997 films
1990s Cantonese-language films
Hong Kong romance films
Hong Kong fantasy films
1990s science fiction action films
1990s romance films
1997 fantasy films
Hong Kong science fiction action films
1990s supernatural films
China Star Entertainment Group films
Films directed by Gordon Chan
Spontaneous human combustion in fiction
1990s Hong Kong films